Mahtowa is an unincorporated community and census-designated place (CDP) in Mahtowa Township, Carlton County, Minnesota, United States. As of the 2010 census, its population was 370.

The community is located between Cloquet and Moose Lake, near the junction of Interstate 35 and Carlton County Road 4.

County Road 4 and County Road 61 are two of the main routes in Mahtowa.

Mahtowa is located 13 miles southwest of Cloquet.  Mahtowa is located 11 miles northeast of Moose Lake; and 32 miles southwest of Duluth.

References

Further reading
 Rand McNally Road Atlas – 2007 edition – Minnesota entry
 Official State of Minnesota Highway Map – 2011/2012 edition
 Mn/DOT map of Carlton County – 2012 edition

Census-designated places in Carlton County, Minnesota
Census-designated places in Minnesota